Treviso, Santa Catarina is a municipality in the state of Santa Catarina in the South region of Brazil.

History 
Diseases and agricultural crises provoked a massive migration from the North of Italy. The most of first settlers of Treviso were Venetian-speakers migrants from that region. The name of the municipality came from Treviso, a comune of Veneto.

See also
List of municipalities in Santa Catarina

References

Municipalities in Santa Catarina (state)